Edward James Farrell (19 October 1889 – 5 February 1960) was an Australian rules footballer who played with Fitzroy and Richmond in the Victorian Football League (VFL).

Notes

External links 

1889 births
1960 deaths
Australian rules footballers from Victoria (Australia)
Fitzroy Football Club players
Richmond Football Club players